NY Breakers is a professional swimming club and one of the original eight clubs of the global International Swimming League (ISL) based in New York City led by general manager, Tim Teeter and head coach, Martin Truijens. The ISL is owned by Konstantin Grigorishin and had its inaugural season in 2019. The original eight clubs were:  DC Trident, the New York Breakers, the LA Current, and the Cali Condors in the United States of America, and the Aqua Centurions, Energy Standard, the London Roar, and IRON in Europe. In 2020 ISL added the Toronto Titans (Canada) and a Tokyo team (Japan) for a total of ten teams.

During the inaugural season in 2019, NY Breakers ended 4th in Lewisville, Budapest and College Park, MD in the preliminary rounds and failed to advance to the finale in Las Vegas.

2019 International Swimming League season

Team roster 
ISL teams had a maximum roster of 32 athletes for 2019 season, with a suggested size of each club's traveling roster of 28 (14 men and 14 women). Each club had a captain and a vice-captain of different gender. The Breakers had one of the most culturally diverse teams of the league after Energy Standard, with athletes from 11 different countries representing the program.

Match results 
In the 2019 (inaugural) ISL season, NY Breakers came 4th during the playoffs and failed to advance to the final.

2020 International Swimming League season

Team roster

Match results

References

International Swimming League
Swimming clubs
Sports teams in New York City
Swim teams in the United States